Karakol International Airport  is an international airport serving Karakol, the capital of Issyk-Kul Province (oblast) of Kyrgyzstan. The Russian IATA code for Karakol International Airport is КПЖ.

Formerly known as Przhevalsk Airport until 1992, Karakol International Airport started its operations in 1940s. The current runway and terminal were built in 1978. On 30 November 2011, the Kyrgyz Government signed a decree and awarded an international status to the airport. Thus, it became Karakol International Airport.

On 2 December 2011, the first international flight landed at Karakol International Airport. SCAT's Antonov AN-24 from Almaty, Kazakhstan, was also the first scheduled flight since 1991 when the airport suffered a decline in passenger numbers. Until 1991, Karakol had regular links with Bishkek, Jalal-Abad, Osh and other towns in Kyrgyzstan.

It is a class 3C airport, meaning that it has no instrument landing facilities and operates only during daylight hours.

Karakol International Airport has customs and border control checks and serves both domestic and international flights. There are plans to starts flights to Bishkek, Jalal-Abad, Osh in Kyrgyzstan as well as Omsk and Novosibirsk in Russia.

Airlines and destinations

References 

 http://www.civilaviation.kg/index.php?option=com_content&view=article&id=51&Itemid=40
 http://www.ourairports.com/airports/UAFP/pilot-info.html
 http://kloop.kg/blog/2011/12/02/karakol-prinyal-pervy-j-regulyarny-j-aviarejs-za-20-let/
 http://www.vb.kg/news/economy/2011/11/30/170938_aeroporty_karakol_pridan_statys_mejdynarodnogo.html

External links 
 http://www.civilaviation.kg/index.php?option=com_content&view=article&id=29&Itemid=46
 http://kloop.kg/blog/2011/12/02/karakol-prinyal-pervy-j-regulyarny-j-aviarejs-za-20-let/
 http://www.vb.kg/news/economy/2011/11/30/170938_aeroporty_karakol_pridan_statys_mejdynarodnogo.html

Airports in Kyrgyzstan
Airports built in the Soviet Union
Issyk-Kul Region